Andrés Jiménez may refer to:

 Andrés Jiménez (basketball) (born 1962), former Spanish basketball player
 Andrés Jiménez (BMX rider) (born 1986), Colombian racing cyclist
 Andrés Jiménez (singer) (born 1947), composer and singer of traditional Puerto Rican folk music
 Andrés Jiménez (soccer) (born 2000), American soccer player of Colombian descent